The Broken Journey is a 1994 Bengali drama film directed by Sandip Ray. It was screened in the Un Certain Regard section at the 1994 Cannes Film Festival. It won the National Film Award for Best Screenplay at the 41st National Film Awards.

Cast
 Lily Chakravarty
 Soumitra Chatterjee as Dr. Sengupta
 Debatosh Ghosh as Haladhar
 Sadhu Meher as Jatin Kundu
 Suvalakshmi as Manashi

References

External links

1994 films
1994 drama films
1990s Bengali-language films
Bengali-language Indian films
Indian drama films
Films directed by Sandip Ray
Films whose writer won the Best Original Screenplay National Film Award